Mickey Muñoz, aka Mickey Munoz, nicknamed "The Mongoose", (born 1937) is an early surfing pioneer and surfboard shaper. 

He was featured in the 2004 surfing documentary Riding Giants. He currently resides in Capistrano Beach, California and designs boards for Surftech, a manufacturer of epoxy boards.

Born in New York City in 1937, he graduated from Santa Monica High School. He was part of the surfing scene at Malibu and was present on June 27, 1956, the day a young lady showed up and Terry "Tubesteak" Tracy  nicknamed her "Gidget". Later, he was the stunt double for Sandra Dee  in the 1959 film Gidget. 

Munoz developed a stance while surfing that became known as the "Quasimodo".

References 

American surfers
Living people
Surfboard shapers
1937 births